Aikaterini "Katerina" Nikolaidou (born 22 October 1992) is a Greek rower. Nikolaidou represented Greece, along with Sofia Asoumanaki at the 2016 Summer Olympics in Rio de Janeiro, Brazil, finishing in the 4th place (Double sculls).
She also won a silver medal in the lightweight single sculls at the 2013 World Rowing Championships and she won the gold medal in the lightweight single sculls at the 2014 European Champion and 2013 European Champion. In 2018 she won the gold medal in the single sculls at the 2018 Mediterranean Games in Tarragona, Spain.

Before joining the Greek National Team of Rowing, she was a swimming athlete. In 2007 as a rower athlete member she joined Nautical Club of Katerini (NOKAT), in Katerini. Her father Yiannis Nikolaidis was a rower athlete. 

In 2021, she started styding at the private institute of vocational training IEK ALFA for the 2-year sports coaching programme.

Katerina Nikolaidou was awarded the Best (Top) Greek Female Athlete Award for 2014 on 15 December 2014, the Best (Top) Greek Female Athlete Award for 2013 on 16 December 2013, which they from the Panhellenic Association of Sports Journalists (PSAT) at its annual awards event PSAT Sports Awards took place in the Melina Mercouri Hall of the Peace and Friendship Stadium in Piraeus.

References

External links
 
 

1992 births
Living people
Greek female rowers
Sportspeople from Katerini
Rowers at the 2016 Summer Olympics
Olympic rowers of Greece
World Rowing Championships medalists for Greece
Mediterranean Games gold medalists for Greece
Mediterranean Games medalists in rowing
Competitors at the 2018 Mediterranean Games
European Rowing Championships medalists